Boxed may refer to:

 Boxed.com, a wholesale on-line shopping site.
 Boxed (Eurythmics), an eight album box set
 Boxed (Mike Oldfield album)
 Boxed warning, a warning that appears on United States packaging
 Boxed (film), a 2019 thriller film